The Gamuza Formation is a geologic formation in Mexico. It preserves fossils dating back to the Ediacaran period.

See also

 List of fossiliferous stratigraphic units in Mexico

References

Ediacaran Mexico